Spiropreussiones are bio-active Preussia isolates.

External links
 Highly specific separation for antitumor Spiropreussione A from endophytic fungal Preussia sp. fermentation broth by one-step macroporous resins AB-8 treatment

Spiro compounds